Spray Falls is a waterfall in the Mount Rainier National Park in Pierce County, Washington. The falls are fed by Spray Creek, which is a tributary of the Puyallup River.

References

Mount Rainier National Park
Waterfalls of Pierce County, Washington
Waterfalls of Washington (state)